Blyry Upper is a townland in Athlone, County Westmeath, Ireland. The townland is in the civil parish of St. Mary's.

The townland covers an area in the east area of the town, Blyry Lower is to the north.

References 

Townlands of County Westmeath